Banana Prince is a 2D platform game for the Nintendo Entertainment System (NES). It was released in Japan by Takara on December 20, 1991. The German version, released in February 1992, features slightly different graphics and gameshow questions.

Gameplay 

As an Island Native, the Banana Prince is on a quest to retrieve the stolen weapons of the island; along the way he'll pick up companions and even appear on a game show, which allows you to warp to another level. Like Jack and the Beanstalk, he has with him a bag of seeds that allows him to grow a flower and climb it. There are also hidden platforms, and doors that can only be reached by collecting flower tokens (which allow him to grow a bigger flower).

Development and release

Reception 

Banana Prince was met with mixed reception from critics since its release. Aktueller Software Markts Thomas Morgen commended the plant-growing mechanic and overall playability but felt mixed in regards to the audiovisual presentation, stating that the game was "rather boring". Likewise, Mega Funs Markus Appel and Sandrie Souleiman felt that the visuals were bearable but praised the music. Both Appel and Souleiman liked the question-based bonus rounds due to their simplicity as well as the story but ultimately remarked that it was an above-average title due to lack of direction. In contrast, Video Games Stephan Englhart noted that its focus on collecting fruit was fresh and gave positive remarks to the varied character animations, technical presentation, precise controls and graphically varied stages. Total!s Thomas Hellwig commented that its gameplay and controls were good but the rest was "rather sloppy" due to the visuals, music and poor text translation.

Retrospective reviews for Banana Prince have been positive. Game Freaks 365s Stan Stepanic compared the game with Kirby's Adventure due to its styling and storyline. Stepanic gave praise to the graphics due to the lack of flickering and slowdown, sound design, gameplay and creativity but remarked that the German questions could prove challenging for those not versed in the language. Hardcore Gaming 101s Kurt Kalata gave the title a positive outlook.

Notes

References

External links 

 Banana Prince at GameFAQs
 Banana Prince at Giant Bomb
 Banana Prince at MobyGames

1991 video games
KID games
Takara video games
Nintendo Entertainment System games
Nintendo Entertainment System-only games
Platform games
Video games developed in Japan